South Dakota Highway 258 (SD 258) is a  state highway in Aurora County, South Dakota. It runs from Interstate 90 (I-90) to U.S. Route 281 (US 281), and is maintained by the South Dakota Department of Transportation (SDDOT). The route is not a part of the National Highway System.

Route description
SD 258 begins at a diamond interchange with exit 308 of I-90 and travels north. The route enters the city of Plankinton almost immediately and continues north. The highway turns east onto Davenport Street in Plankinton and a curve takes the highway to the northeast. After leaving Plankinton, the road curves back to the east and continues through open plains for about  before reaching its eastern terminus at an intersection with US 281. The roadway continues east of this intersection as County Road 34.

SD 258 is maintained by SDDOT. In 2012, the traffic on the road was measured in average annual daily traffic. SD 258 was measured at 900 vehicles. The highway is not a part of the National Highway System, a system of highways important to the nation's defense, economy, and mobility.

South Dakota Highway 203

South Dakota Highway 203 (SD 203) is a  poorly signed spur off of SD 258, located along the eastern outskirts of Plankinton. It connects the town, via SD 258, to the Aurora Plains Academy (a youth treatment facility and school).

SD 203 begins at an intersection with SD 258, immediately crossing a railroad track before heading north through flat plains to pass by the Plankinton baseball field and have an intersection with County Road 32 (CR 32, E 3rd Street), before passing by a derby racetrack and a cemetery. The highway has an intersection with 10th Street before state maintenance ends just shortly after passing by one of the entrances to Aurora Plains Academy, with the road continuing north as a gravel county road (County Road 39 (CR 39), 387th Avenue).

The entire length of South Dakota Highway 203 is a paved, rural, two-lane state highway.

Major intersections

References

External links

 The Unofficial South Dakota Highways Page

258
Transportation in Aurora County, South Dakota